Slobozia is a commune located in Giurgiu County, Muntenia, Romania. It is composed of a single village, Slobozia.

References

Communes in Giurgiu County
Localities in Muntenia
Populated places on the Danube